The Secretary of Guam was the equivalent of the Lieutenant Governor of Guam when the Governorship was still appointed by the President of the United States. The office became the Lieutenant Governor of Guam when island residents began electing the position, along with the Governor, rather than having them appointed.

Duties
Public Law 90-497 illustrated most of the Secretary of Guam's duties and powers. The Guam Organic Act of 1950 established that the Secretary of Guam  would be "a lesser official . . . who would perform the functions of Lieutenant Governor as well as other administrative duties." The Elective Governor Act of 1968 replaced the office with that of an official, elected Lieutenant Governor, which went into effect one year later.

Public law 9-69, passed on July 7, 1967, mandated that all administrative regulations must be filed with the Secretary of Guam for compilation and publishing. These rules did not become effective until such filing. These duties were transferred to the Legislature of Guam by P.L. 12-41 on September 17, 1973.

List of Secretaries of Guam
In total, there were seven Secretaries of Guam, three of which, William Corbett, Marcellus Boss, and Manuel Flores Leon Guerrero, went on to become Governors of Guam. Kurt Moylan also served as the first elected Lieutenant Governor of Guam.

Randall Herman (1950 – 1953)
William Corbett (1953 – 1956)
Marcellus Boss (1956 – 1959)
A. M. Edwards (1960 – 1961)
Manuel Flores Leon Guerrero (1961 – 1963)
Denver Dickerson (1963 – 1969)
Kurt Moylan (1969 - January 1, 1971 termination of position)

Assistant Secretary of Guam
Richard Barrett Lowe originated the position of Assistant Secretary of Guam early in his term, naming Manuel Flores Leon Guerrero to the position.

References

Additional sources 

 

Secretary
Secretaries of Guam
State secretaries of state of the United States